Senecio verbascifolius, the mullein ragwort, is a species of plant from South Africa.

Description 
The leaves are oval shaped or heart shaped with minute teeth along the margins. Flowers are present between September and December. They are yellow and grow in branched corymbs. The involucre is calyx-like. The bracts are thickened below.

Distribution and habitat 
This species is endemic to the Western Cape of South Africa. It grows on sheltered south facing rocky slopes on the Cape Peninsula and the Hottentots Holland Mountains.

Conservation 
This species is considered to be endangered by the South African National Biodiversity Institute due to its small range and specialist nature. Only about 250 individuals occur in the wild, but the population appears to be stable and does not currently face any threats.

References 

Plants described in 1768
Flora of South Africa
verbascifolius